The Juno Awards of 2021, honouring Canadian music achievements, were presented on 6 June 2021, observing the 50th anniversary of these awards. The main ceremonies were televised on CBC.

The ceremony was originally scheduled to take place in March, but in December 2020 organizers announced that it was being pushed back to May, before being pushed back again to June, due to the ongoing COVID-19 pandemic in Canada. 

The awards had originally been planned to take place as a conventional live gala in Toronto, Ontario, although due to the continued pandemic these plans were cancelled; instead, the televised ceremony consisted of prerecorded or live performances by Canadian musicians at various venues throughout Canada, alongside acknowledgements of the already-announced winners and the presentation of just six top categories. Angeline Tetteh-Wayoe of CBC Music hosted the ceremony from Toronto's Rebel nightclub, although most award presenters and performances were broadcast from other remote locations.

The awards in most categories were presented in a pre-show event on June 4. Prior to the main ceremony, Alessia Cara hosted a one-hour special called My Junos Moment, in which various Canadian artists were asked to share their reflections and reminiscences on their memorable moments at past Juno ceremonies.

Performers 
The full list of performers were announced on 27 May 2021.

Presenters
The full list of presenters were announced on 27 May 2021, following the list of performers.

 Susan Aglukark
 Will Arnett
 The Basement Gang
 Paul Brandt
 Michael Bublé
 Alessia Cara
 Jim Cuddy
 Steven Guilbeault
 Kaytranada
 Max Kerman
 Geddy Lee and Alex Lifeson of Rush
 Gordon Lightfoot
 Sarah McLachlan
 Anne Murray
 Andrew Phung
 Ed Robertson
 Buffy Sainte-Marie
 Liberty Silver
 Shania Twain

Winners and nominees
Nominees were announced on 9 March 2021.

The Tragically Hip were presented with the Juno Humanitarian Award. Due to the cancellation of the 2020 ceremony, singer-songwriter Jann Arden received her formal induction into the Canadian Music Hall of Fame following its announcement the previous year.

A segment of the television broadcast also profiled Mary Piercey-Lewis, a music teacher from Inuksuk High School in Iqaluit, Nunavut who was named Teacher of the Year by MusiCounts, CARAS' music education initiative.

People

Albums

Songs and recordings

Other

References

External links

2021
2021 in Canadian music
2021 music awards
2021 in Toronto
June 2021 events in Canada